Gotthard Fischer (10 January 1891 – 27 July 1969) was a German general (Generalleutnant) in the Wehrmacht during World War II who commanded several divisions. He was a recipient of the Knight's Cross of the Iron Cross of Nazi Germany.

Fischer surrendered to the Red Army in April 1945 in the Courland Pocket. Convicted as a war criminal in the Soviet Union, he was held until 1955.

Awards

 Knight's Cross of the Iron Cross on 7 February 1944 as Oberst and commander of 126. Infanterie-Division

References

Citations

Bibliography

1891 births
1965 deaths
German Army personnel of World War I
German prisoners of war in World War II held by the Soviet Union
Lieutenant generals of the German Army (Wehrmacht)
People from East Prussia
People from Gołdap
Prussian Army personnel
Recipients of the clasp to the Iron Cross, 1st class
Recipients of the Gold German Cross
Recipients of the Knight's Cross of the Iron Cross